Karen Olsson (born 1972) is an American novelist and nonfiction writer. 

Her first novel, Waterloo (FSG 2005), is set in a thinly veiled version of Austin, Texas.  The book follows a down-on-his-motivation reporter at an alternative weekly paper as he tries to get over a failed relationship and investigate some irregular goings-on at the state capitol.  Writing in the New York Times Book Review, Mark Costello described Waterloo as "a melancholy comedy of Texas politics [written] with great wit and assurance." 

Her second novel, All the Houses, was published by Farrar, Straus and Giroux in 2015. Set in Washington, D.C., it is narrated by the middle daughter of a family that has come undone in the wake of the Iran-contra scandal.

In 2019, Olsson will publish The Weil Conjectures, which combines a memoir of her college years with a biography of mathematician André Weil.

A former editor of The Texas Observer, Olsson is a contributing editor at Texas Monthly and has written for Slate.com and The New York Times Magazine.  She lives in Austin with her family.

References

 NY Times book review by Mark Costello, accessed 17 October 2006.
 Texas Monthly masthead, accessed 17 October 2006.

External links

 author website
 Excerpt from Waterloo in Texas Monthly
 review of Waterloo in The Believer.
 Stray Questions for Karen Olsson  in "the New York Times"
 Why Are Tortilla Chips So Damn Good by Karen Olsson in "[Texas Monthly]"

1972 births
Living people
21st-century American novelists
American women novelists
Writers from Austin, Texas
American women journalists
21st-century American women writers
Novelists from Texas
21st-century American non-fiction writers